Hankow Airfield (Chinese: 王家墩机场), also known as Wuhan Wangjiadun Airport, was an airfield in Wangjiadun, Hankow City, Hubei, China that closed in 2007. Constructed in 1931, it was a busy military airfield during the Second Sino-Japanese War in WWII, used by both the Chinese and her American allies, the USAAF Fourteenth Air Force. From 1950, the military airfield was managed by the People's Liberation Army Air Force. From the mid 1980s to 2007, it was also a civil airfield. It was demolished in 2007 and transformed into the Wuhan Central Business District. Its current site is near the junction of Huaihai Road (淮海路) and Yunfei Road (云飞路), Wangjiadun neighborhood (王家墩), Wuhan. (30.601138, 114.244264)

Accidents
Wuhan Airlines Flight 343, 2000

References

 Maurer, Maurer. Air Force Combat Units Of World War II. Maxwell Air Force Base, Alabama: Office of Air Force History, 1983.

External link

1931 establishments in China
2007 disestablishments in China
Airfields of the United States Army Air Forces in China
Airports established in 1931
Airports disestablished in 2007
Airports in Hubei
World War II airfields in the China-Burma-India Theater